John Wilfred Jenkinson (1871–1915) was a pioneer in the field of comparative developmental biology (the forerunner of evolutionary developmental biology) and one of the first to introduce experimental embryology to the UK at the start of the 20th century. He originally studied Classics as an undergraduate student at Oxford, before switching his attention to Zoology under the guidance of W. F. R. Weldon at University College London. He also travelled to Utrecht in the Netherlands, to work with Hubrecht, and was exposed to new methods and approaches in embryology. In 1905, he was appointed the first lecturer in Embryology at the University of Oxford in England, and in 1909 published the first English textbook on experimental embryology  in which he summarized recent work in the emerging scientific discipline and criticized neo-vitalist theories of Hans Driesch.

At the outbreak of war in 1914, Jenkinson joined the Oxford Volunteer Training Corps. In January 1915 he was assigned to the 12th Battalion of the Worcestershire Regiment and was soon promoted to the rank of captain. Jenkinson left England with his regiment in May, posted to the Dardanelles in Turkey. On 4 June 1915, just days after arriving on the Gallipoli peninsula, Jenkinson was killed. After Jenkinson's death at Gallipoli in June 1915, the University of Oxford established the John Wilfred Jenkinson Lectureship in his memory. The original statutes required the lecturer or lecturers, appointed annually, to deliver “one or more lectures or lecture demonstrations on comparative or experimental embryology”.

Each year, a Board of Electors selects one or two Jenkinson Lecturers who are invited to Oxford to present a lecture in the broad area of developmental biology. The list of Jenkinson Lecturers includes many distinguished names, including Nobel Laureates (marked with *).

Holders of the J. W. Jenkinson Lectureship

 1961 Michail Fischberg
 1962 P. H. Tuft 
 1963 Wolfgang Beerman
 1964 Jean Brachet
 1965 Rupert E. Billingham,
 1966 Jan Erik Edstrom
 1966 Alberto Monroy
 1967 *Bob Edwards
 1968 Georg Klein
 1969 R. M. Gaze
 1969 H. Chantrenne
 1970 *Sydney Brenner
 1970 Niels Kaj Jerne
 1971 Ernst Hadorn
 1971 J. M. Mitchison
 1972 Anne McLaren
 1972 G. Gerisch
 1973 Susumu Ohno
 1974 Ruggero Ceppellini
 1975 Andrzej Tarkowski
 1976 No formal lecture was held
 1977 Nils R. Ringertz
 1978 Martin Luscher
 1978 Armin C. Braun
 1980 Pasko Rakic
 1980 Walter Fiers
 1980 Nicole Le Douarin
 1981 Werner Reichardt
 1981 Antonio Garcia-Bellido
 1982 Lionel Jaffe
 1982 Maurice Sussmann
 1983 Stanley M. Crain
 1984 Rudolf Jaenisch
 1984 *Robert G. Edwards
 1985 G. S. Dawes
 1985 *François Jacob
 1985 Hans G. Schweiger
 1986 W. Maxwell Cowan
 1986 Marc Kirschner
 1986 Peter A. Lawrence
 1987 *Gerald Edelman
 1988 Corey Goodman
 1989 Josef Schell
 1989 *John Gurdon
 1989 Webster K. Cavenee
 1990 Kai Simons
 1991 Carla Shatz
 1991 Harold Weintraub
 1992 Manfred Schartl
 1992 Noriyuki Satoh
 1992 Bruce Cattanach
 1993 Chuck B. Kimmell
 1993 Andrew Lumsden
 1994 Peter Gruss
 1995 Brigid Hogan
 1996 Ray Guillery
 1996 Susan K McConnell
 1997 James C Smith
 1997 Cliff Tabin
 1997 *Tim Hunt
 1998 Peter J. Bryant
 1999 Davor Solter
 1999 Françoise Dieterlan-Lievre
 2000 Peter Holland
 2000 Max Bear
 2000 Eduardo Boncinelli
 2001 Marc Tessier-Lavigne
 2002 *Roger Tsien
 2002 Enrico Coen
 2003 Mike Bate
 2004 Cheryll Tickle
 2004 Rudy Raff
 2005 Gerd Jürgens
 2005 David Weisblat
 2006 Stephen Cohen
 2006 Michael Akam
 2007 Shigeru Kuratani
 2007 Janet Rossant
 2008 Richard Gardner
 2008 Didier Stainier
 2009 Sean B. Carroll
 2009 Wendy Bickmore
 2010 Nick Hastie
 2010 Paul Sternberg
 2010 David Kingsley
 2011 Jurgen Knoblich
 2012 Caroline Dean
 2012 Hopi Hoekstra
 2013 Olivier Pourquie
 2013 Nipam Patel
 2014 Gero Miesenböck
 2014 Alex Schier
2015 *John Gurdon
2016  Detlef Weigel
2016 Linda Partridge
2017 *Jennifer Doudna
 2018 Liqun Luo
2018 Elizabeth Robertson
 2019 Andrea Brand
 2019 *Shinya Yamanaka
 2022 Nancy Papalopulu
 2023 Denis Duboule
Forthcoming

Lectureship management
The lecturers are elected by an electoral board consisting of: the vice-chancellor of the University of Oxford; the rector of Exeter College, Oxford; the Regius Professor of Medicine; the Linacre Professor of Zoology; the Waynflete Professor of Physiology; Dr. Lee's Professor of Anatomy; and a member of the Mathematical, Physical and Life Sciences Board elected by that board.

References

1915 establishments in England
Jenkinson
Embryology
Developmental biology
Lists of biologists